"All Of Me (Boy Oh Boy)" is a song by Italian popstar Sabrina, released in Italy in July 1988 as the first single from her second album, Super Sabrina (1988). It was also her fifth international single. Written and produced by Stock Aitken & Waterman, it followed her previous single "Hot Girl" in Europe, while it was her second single release in the UK, following "Boys (Summertime Love)".

Entering the charts in mid-summer 1988, the single became Sabrina's third major European hit. It followed "Boys (Summertime Love)" and "Hot Girl" into the top 10 or top 20 in several countries on the European continent, and made the top 30 in the UK. It spent 18 weeks in the French top 50 and made top 30 in the overall Eurochart. Its estimated worldwide sales are around 400,000-500,000 copies.

Background and writing
Written and produced by Stock Aitken & Waterman, the song is a typical dance pop record of the SAW stable. 

“It was fun working with them," Sabrina said. “They don't waste time. They like to get the job done with. 

“Of course, I had heard of them before and I liked a lot of the records they did. I have heard a lot of people say they don't like them but I think these people are jealous."

Matt Aitken praised Sabrina's performance in the studio, saying "as a singer she was pretty decent", but noted her modest clothing during the session "did not fulfil the promise that was expected."

Written especially for Sabrina, the lyrics, production and melody are slightly reminiscent of Sabrina's international breakthrough hit "Boys": the structure of the introductions are similar and while the chorus in "Boys" is built around the phrase 'Boys, boys, boys', in "All of Me" it is 'Boy, oh, boy'.

Aitken expressed disappointment over the song's chart performance relative to "Boys", musing that "maybe the shock value was gone, or maybe they didn't shoot the right scene in the swimming pool for the video."

Critical reception
Pan-European magazine Music & Media wrote, "A killing combination of Sabrina and SAW on a jaunty, perky little number. Definitive Euro-disco." In 2021, British magazine Classic Pop ranked the song number 39 in their list of 'Top 40 Stock Aitken Waterman songs', noted that "the Italo disco feel is pronounced" on this song, that "[Sabrina] is Italian, so it made complete sense for SAW to go in that direction for this creation, written specifically with her in mind" and concluded that Britishs "fell for her neon spandex looks and hooky melodies too".

Music video
 Two music videos were prepared for the single - one by Sabrina's Italian team/label to coincide with the single's early European release, and one made later by her UK label for the single's UK release. In the European version of the video, she's seen playing a Dynacord Rhythm Stick.

Formats and track listings
 7" single
 "All of Me (Boy Oh Boy)" - 3:58
 "All of Me (Boy Oh Boy)" (instrumental) - 4:29

 12" single
 "All of Me (Boy Oh Boy)" (extended mix) - 5:15
 "All of Me (Boy Oh Boy)" (instrumental) - 4:29
 "All of Me (Boy Oh Boy)" - 3:58

 12" remix
 "All of Me (Boy Oh Boy)" (Boy Oh Boy Mix) - 6:06
 "All of Me (Boy Oh Boy)" (instrumental) - 4:29
 "All of Me (Boy Oh Boy)" - 3:58

 CD single
 "All of Me (Boy Oh Boy)" (extended mix) - 5:15
 "All of Me (Boy Oh Boy)" (instrumental) - 4:29
 "All of Me (Boy Oh Boy)" - 3:58

Charts

Weekly charts

Year-end charts

References

1988 singles
Sabrina Salerno songs
Songs written by Mike Stock (musician)
Songs written by Matt Aitken
Songs written by Pete Waterman
1988 songs
Song recordings produced by Stock Aitken Waterman